Spencer Pession (born 19 January 1972) is a British former alpine skier who competed in the 1994 Winter Olympics.

References

1972 births
Living people
British male alpine skiers
Olympic alpine skiers of Great Britain
Alpine skiers at the 1994 Winter Olympics
Place of birth missing (living people)